William Williams (4 January 1875 – 13 January 1968), better known by his bardic name of "Crwys", meaning "Cross", was a Welsh poet in the Welsh language. He served as Archdruid of the National Eisteddfod of Wales from 1939 to 1947.

Like all other Archdruids, Crwys had himself won several major prizes at the National Eisteddfod. He was a three-time winner of the crown: at Colwyn Bay in 1910, at Carmarthen in 1911, and at Corwen in 1919. A cast bronze bust in honour of the poet is on display at Carmarthen Castle.

Works
Ednyfed Fychan (1910). Inspired by the life of Ednyfed Fychan.
Dysgub y Dail
Melin Trefin
Cerddi Crwys (1920)
Cerddi Newydd Crwys (1924)
A brief history of Rehoboth Congregational Church, Bryn-mawr, from 1643 to 1927 (1927)
Trydydd Cerddi Crwys (1935)
Mynd a dod (1941)
Cerddi Crwys, y pedwerydd llyfr (1944)
Pedair Pennod (1950)

References

1875 births
1968 deaths
Crowned bards
Welsh-language poets
Welsh Eisteddfod archdruids